Přemysl Krbec (28 January 1940 – 31 August 2021) was a Czech gymnast. He was born in Litovel, Bohemia and Moravia, Germany, and competed for Czechoslovakia in the 1964 Summer Olympics. His strongest event was the vault and he was the world champion in 1962 and European champion in 1963 in the discipline.

References

External links
 

1940 births
2021 deaths
People from Litovel
Czech male artistic gymnasts
Olympic gymnasts of Czechoslovakia
Gymnasts at the 1964 Summer Olympics
European champions in gymnastics
Sportspeople from the Olomouc Region